Bob Gregory may refer to:

 Bob Gregory (comics) (1921–2003), American comics artist and writer
 Bob Gregory (cricketer) (1902–1973), English cricketer
 Bob Gregory (politician) (born 1936), Australian politician
 Bob Gregory (American football), American college football coach and former player

See also
 Bob Gregorie or Eugene Turenne Gregorie (1908–2002), American yacht and automobile designer
 Bob Gregor (born 1957), American former pro football player
 Robert Gregory (disambiguation)